Harold Hewitt (24 June 1919 – 2011) was an English professional footballer who played in the Football League for Mansfield Town.

References

1919 births
2011 deaths
English footballers
Association football forwards
English Football League players
Chesterfield F.C. players
Mansfield Town F.C. players
Grantham Town F.C. players